Dentsville may refer to:

 Dentsville, Maryland
 Dentsville, South Carolina

See also
 Dentville, Mississippi